Preminger is a surname of Jewish origin. It may refer to:

Eliezer Preminger (1920–2001), Israeli politician
Erik Lee Preminger (born 1944), American writer and actor
Ingo Preminger (1911–2006), American film producer
Noah Preminger (born 1986), American musician
Otto Preminger (1905–1986), American film director
Tanya Preminger (born 1945), Israeli sculptor